William P. Murphy Jr. (born November 11, 1923) is a medical doctor and inventor of medical devices including collaborating on a flexible sealed blood bag used for blood transfusions. He is the son of the American physician William Parry Murphy who shared the Nobel Prize in Physiology for Medicine in 1934, and Harriett Adams, the first licensed female dentist in Massachusetts.

Education

Murphy graduated from Harvard University in 1946 with a major in pre-medicine and a minor in architecture. He received his M.D. in 1947 from the University of Illinois and also studied physiologic instrumentation at the Massachusetts Institute of Technology from 1947 to 1948.

Career
Murphy practiced medicine for a short time as an intern at St. Francis Hospital in Honolulu and later, at Peter Bent Brigham Hospital in Boston (now Brigham & Women's Hospital). While at St. Francis, he developed his first medical invention—a projector for presenting full-size x-rays to large audiences. Murphy and the other interns were regularly required to show x-rays of their patients to doctors. To simplify this task, Murphy created a projector that was capable of showing a full-size x-ray on the screen and was easy to use—quite an accomplishment at that time, since a prompt means for converting x-rays to transparencies did not exist.

Murphy's next contribution to the medical world coincided with the Korean War. The U.S. Army first came to Murphy while he was working with a team of doctors in Boston on the first dialysis machines, a program the Army supported because of concerns over exposure to radiation from the Atomic bomb. An offshoot of this work was the refinement of flexible bags to contain blood during transfusions, which offered many advantages to previously used bottles. Developed with Carl Walter, the bags preserve red blood cells and proteins and ensure that the contents are not exposed to air. In 1952, Murphy joined the U.S. Public Health Service as a blood transfusion consultant, and went to Korea to perform transfusions on soldiers injured in battle.

In 1957, he founded his first company, Medical Development Corporation. The company, which focused on building research instruments, eventually grew into Cordis Corporation, and is now a Johnson & Johnson company. Cordis gave Murphy the resources to create a number of today's standard medical devices, including the first physiologic cardiac pacemaker; the widely used hollow fiber artificial kidney; the first disposable medical procedural trays; the first motor-driven angiographic injectors; and the first disposable catheters.

Murphy's physiologic cardiac pacemaker—which is used to treat heart block—senses what a patient's heart needs and provides suitable stimulation so that the heart can function normally. As more doctors began to use implantable pacemakers, it became clear that there needed to be a way to alter the function of the pacemakers while they were implanted. This led Murphy and his team to develop pacemakers that could be programmed externally and, ultimately, to develop the first DDD (dual chamber demand) pacemaker (1980s).

Murphy's motor-driven, high-pressure angiographic injectors are used for injecting a small amount of radiographic contrast (a solution containing iodine, which is easily visualized with x-ray images) into select vessels in the body. The images that are produced, called an angiogram, accurately reveal the extent and severity of blockages. The disposable, torque-controlled vascular catheters—a related invention, created with colleague Robert Stevens—allow for easy entry into specific vessels, and are a sterile one-time use product.

While at Cordis, Murphy found it difficult to obtain the appropriate quantities and types of materials needed to complete his prototypes. To overcome this, he started Small Parts, Inc., a Miami, FL-based company that provides materials and tools to engineers—in any amount—to help facilitate completion of projects. The company, well known throughout the medical and engineering communities, is one of several companies founded by Murphy and among 30 companies that emerged from Cordis. In 1986, Murphy, together with colleague John Sterner, purchased Hyperion, Inc. Also based in Miami, Hyperion designs, manufactures and markets medical laboratory diagnostic devices.

Murphy is currently the chairman of the board of directors at U.S. Stem Cell, formerly Bioheart.

U.S. Patents

Murphy holds 17 U.S. patents issued between 1952 and 1980.

*          Walter B. Dandliker, PhD       Coinventor

**         J. Walter Keller                     Coinventor

***        BJ. Lipps                              Coinventor

Publications
He co-authored nearly 30 medical publications and helped to establish several professional organizations such as FIRST (For Inspiration and Recognition of Science and Technology), a non-profit group dedicated to inspiring young people's interest in science, technology and engineering, founded by his friend Dean Kamen.

Medical Licenses
Murphy is licensed to practice medicine in three states: California (license #C018494), Florida (license #0007401), and Massachusetts (license #23378)

References

1923 births
Harvard University alumni
University of Illinois alumni
Massachusetts Institute of Technology alumni
Living people
Fellows of the American Institute for Medical and Biological Engineering
21st-century American biologists